Madakasira Assembly constituency is a SC (Scheduled Caste) reserved constituency of the Andhra Pradesh Legislative Assembly, India. It is one among 6 constituencies in the Sri Sathya Sai district.

Overview
It is part of the Hindupur Lok Sabha constituency along with another six Vidhan Sabha segments, namely, Raptadu, Hindupur, Penukonda, Puttaparthi, Dharmavaram and Kadiri in Sri Sathya Sai district.

Mandals

Members of Legislative Assembly

Election results

Assembly elections 1952

Assembly Elections 2004

Assembly Elections 2009

Assembly Elections 2014

Assembly Elections 2019

See also
 List of constituencies of Andhra Pradesh Legislative Assembly

References

http://www.andhrajyothy.com/artical?SID=671913

Assembly constituencies of Andhra Pradesh